This is a list of notable events in country music that took place in the year 1949.

Events 
December 10 — Billboard begins a "Country & Western Records Most Played by Folk Disk Jockeys" chart – the first chart ever to track a song's popularity by radio airplay. The first No. 1 song on the new chart is "Mule Train" by Tennessee Ernie Ford. With the new chart, there are three charts gauging a song's popularity, with the sales and jukebox charts also being used.

Top hits of the year

Number one hits
(As certified by Billboard magazine)

Note: Several songs were simultaneous No. 1 hits on the separate "Most Played Juke Box Folk (later Country & Western) Records," "Best Selling Retail Folk (later Country & Western) Records) and – starting December 10 – "Country & Western Records Most Played by Folk Disk Jockeys" charts.

Top country records of 1949

The following songs appeared in The Billboard's 'Best-Selling Retail Folk Records' and 'Most-Played Juke Box Folk Records' charts during 1949. Each week fifteen points were awarded to the number one record, then nine points for number two, eight points for number three, and so on. The total points a record earned determined its year-end rank.  Additional information was obtained from the "Discography of American Historical Recordings" website,  'Cashbox', and other sources as noted. 

Top new album releases

 Births 
 January 6 — Joey Miskulin, also known as "Joey the Cowpolka King", member of Riders in the Sky.
 January 22 - J.P. Pennington, member of the 1980s group Exile.
 May 26 — Hank Williams, Jr., son of country music pioneer Hank Williams who became a star in his own right, fusing elements of honky tonk and blues with rock.
 June 17 - Russell Smith, American singer-songwriter (Amazing Rhythm Aces, died 2019).
 August 23 — Woody Paul, "King of the Cowboy Fiddlers" member of Riders in the Sky.
 August 25 – Henry Paul, lead singer of the 1990s country group BlackHawk.
 August 27 — Jeff Cook, member of Alabama (died 2022).
 October 23 – Nick Tosches, American journalist, music critic and writer (Country''), (died 2019).
 December 13 — Randy Owen, member of Alabama.

Deaths 
 December 11 — Fiddlin' John Carson, 81, one of country music's first popular recording artist on a nationwide basis.

References

Further reading 
 Kingsbury, Paul, "Vinyl Hayride: Country Music Album Covers 1947–1989," Country Music Foundation, 2003
 Millard, Bob, "Country Music: 70 Years of America's Favorite Music," HarperCollins, New York, 1993
 Whitburn, Joel. "Top Country Songs 1944–2005 – 6th Edition." 2005.

Country
Country music by year